Eliakim Eddy Tupper (1822 – July 31, 1895) was a block maker and political figure in Nova Scotia, Canada. He represented Digby County in the Nova Scotia House of Assembly from 1890 to 1895 as a Liberal member.

He was born in Round Hill, Nova Scotia, the son of David Tupper. He served as a member of the council for Digby County. Tupper died in office at Bear River.

References 
 A Directory of the Members of the Legislative Assembly of Nova Scotia, 1758-1958, Public Archives of Nova Scotia (1958)

1822 births
1895 deaths
Nova Scotia Liberal Party MLAs